George Askew  may refer to:

George Edward Askew (died 1779), English dramatist
 George Askew (Radium line) tugboat built and operated by the Radium line

See also
George Ayscue (c. 1616–1671), English naval officer